A ploce is a figure of speech in which a word is separated or repeated with a delay in order to emphasize a statement. Similar to epizeuxis which denotes an immediate repetition, ploce deliberately adds an intervening word between repetitions for a distinct rhetorical effect.

Examples
 "I am that I am." - Exodus 3:14
 "Make war upon themselves - brother to brother / Blood to blood, self against self." - Richard III, by Shakespeare
 "My lovely one I fain would love thee much, but all my Love is none at all I see." - Edward Taylor, "Preparatory Meditation 12"

See also
 Repetition (rhetorical device)

References

Figures of speech